Louis Alexander Philip Waymouth (born 14 April 1978) is an English writer and actor best known for his work on The Late Late Show with James Corden.

Early life and background 
Louis Waymouth was born in London in 1978. His father is artist Nigel Waymouth, co-founder of King's Road boutique Granny Takes a Trip and part of the two-man team Hapshash and the Coloured Coat, which designed psychedelic posters in the 1960s. His mother, Lady Victoria Yorke (1947–2004), was an interior designer who designed fabrics for Osborne & Little, and was a daughter of Philip Yorke, 9th Earl of Hardwicke. The 10th and current earl, Joseph Yorke, is Waymouth's first cousin.

Waymouth trained as an actor at London Academy of Music and Dramatic Art.

Career 
Waymouth started his career appearing in various television roles, including the BBC mini series Egypt and Charlie Brooker’s Black Mirror.

Prior to his work in the United States, Waymouth wrote on numerous comedy shows in the United Kingdom, including the BAFTA Award-winning The Armstrong and Miller Show, the Rose d’Or-winning  Psychobitches, and Jim Henson’s Me and My Monsters. In 2012 he created the comedy web series Knighthood & Decoy with his writing partner Jamie Lennox, in which they both played the title roles.

Waymouth has lived in Los Angeles since 2015 and is a writer on The Late Late Show with James Corden. He has also become one of its regular performers, appearing in numerous sketches and recurring pieces. In 2017 he starred in the Emmy Award-winning Snapchat series James Corden’s Next James Corden.

In 2018, Waymouth was also part of the writing team for the 60th Annual Grammy Awards.

Personal life 

On 7 September 2013, Waymouth married Lady Eloise Anson (born 1981) in Cranborne, Dorset. Lady Eloise is a prosthetic makeup artist and the daughter of Patrick Anson, 5th Earl of Lichfield, and Lady Leonora Grosvenor. She is also a goddaughter of Anne, Princess Royal. The couple have a daughter, Iris (born 2015), and a son, Jack (born 2017).

References

English male television actors
Living people
1978 births
Alumni of the London Academy of Music and Dramatic Art
Male actors from London
Television people from London
English television writers
English male writers